Anton Franz Edthofer (18 September 1883 – 21 February 1971) was an Austrian actor.

Partial filmography

 The Sacrifice (1918)
 Freier Dienst (1918) - Landovsky
 Maria Magdalena (1919)
 The Eyes of the World (1920) - Heinz Kay
 Moj (1920) - Josef Tschamberl
 The Secret of Bombay (1921) - Schiffsarzt Vittorio
 Four Around a Woman (1921) - Werner Krafft - William Krafft sein Zwillingsbruder
 The Love Corridor (1921) - Graf Troll
 Eine Frau mit Vergangenheit (1921)
 Hazard (1921) - Ihr Bruder, der Gentleman Dieb
 Playing with Fire (1921)
 The Oath of Stephan Huller (1921) - Friedrich Huller
 Father Won't Allow It (1921) - Toni Biebelhuber
 Barmaid (1922) - Dr. Harry Dorn
 Countess Walewska (1922) - Graf D'Evians, zeitweiliger Adjutant
 Insulted and Humiliated (1922)
 Shadows of the Past (1922) - Jens Holmberg - Artist
 Phantom (1922) - Wigottschinski
 Nora (1923) - Dr. Rank
 Fridericus Rex - 3. Teil: Sanssouci (1923) - Prinz Wilhelm
 The Princess Suwarin (1923) - Mniewski
 Bob und Mary (1923) - Bob
 The Street (1923) - Zuhälter
 Boarding House Groonen (1925)
 The Guardsman (1927) - Kritiker
 Die Strecke (1927) - Unterbeamter Kramer
 Artists (1928) - Der Todesfahrer Henrik Elcot
 Sensations-Prozess (1928) - Baron Gart
 The Burning Heart (1929) - Baron
 Poor as a Church Mouse (1931) - Baron Thomas von Ullrich
 Madame Bluebeard (1931) - Schiereisen
 Dreaming Lips (1932) - Peter
 Moral und Liebe (1933)
 A Precocious Girl (1934) - Dr. Lohnau
 A Woman Who Knows What She Wants (1934) - Erik Mattisson, Großindustrieller
 Pygmalion (1935) - Oberst Pickering
 Die Pompadour (1935) - Ludwig XV
 The Emperor's Candlesticks (1936) - Erzherzog Ludwig
 The Unexcused Hour (1937) - Dr. Karl Henning - Professor
 Der Hampelmann (1938) - Nikolaus Rohr
 Wie ein Dieb in der Nacht (1945)
 The Other Life (1948) - General Rissius
 The Angel with the Trumpet (1948) - Kaiser Franz Josef
 Viennese Girls (1949) - Hofrat Munk
 The Angel with the Trumpet (1950) - Emperor Franz Joseph

Bibliography
 Jung, Uli & Schatzberg, Walter. Beyond Caligari: The Films of Robert Wiene. Berghahn Books, 1999.

External links

1883 births
1971 deaths
Austrian male film actors
Austrian male stage actors
Austrian male silent film actors
Male actors from Vienna
20th-century Austrian male actors